Naxos is one of the regional units of Greece. It is part of the region of South Aegean. The regional unit covers the islands of Naxos, Amorgos, Donousa, Irakleia, Schoinoussa, the Koufonisia islands and several smaller islands in the Aegean Sea.

Administration

As a part of the 2011 Kallikratis government reform, the regional unit Naxos was created out of part of the former Cyclades Prefecture. It is subdivided into 2 municipalities. These are (number as in the map in the infobox):

Amorgos (2)
Naxos and Lesser Cyclades (Naxos & Mikres Kyklades, 13)

Province
The province of Naxos was one of the provinces of the Cyclades Prefecture. It had the same territory as the present regional unit. It was abolished in 2006.

References

 
Regional units of the South Aegean
2011 establishments in Greece
Provinces of Greece